Dirk Geeraerts (born 24 October 1955) is a Belgian linguist. He is professor emeritus of theoretical linguistics at the University of Leuven, Belgium. He is the founder of the research unit Quantitative Lexicology and Variational Linguistics (QLVL). 
His main research interests involve the overlapping fields of lexical semantics, lexicology, and lexicography, with a theoretical focus on cognitive semantics. His involvement with cognitive linguistics dates from the 1980s, when in his PhD thesis he was one of the first in Europe to explore the possibilities of a prototype-theoretical model of categorization. As the founder of the journal Cognitive Linguistics and as the editor (with Hubert Cuyckens) of the Oxford Handbook of Cognitive Linguistics, he played an instrumental role in the international expansion of cognitive linguistics. Geeraerts is one of the outspoken advocates of the implementation of empirical methodologies, such as corpus linguistics in cognitive linguistic research. He also argues for the involvement of more pragmatic elements such as contextual factors, lectal variation, and language history that influence the construal of word meanings and the choice of lexical items for concepts.

Books 
His publications include the following monographs:
D. Geeraerts, Paradigm and Paradox (1985). Leuven: Leuven University Press.
D. Geeraerts, Woordbetekenis (1986). Leuven: Acco.
D. Geeraerts, Wat er in een woord zit (1989) Leuven: Peeters.
D. Geeraerts, S. Grondelaers & P. Bakema, The Structure of Lexical Variation (1994). Berlin: Mouton de Gruyter.
D. Geeraerts, Diachronic Prototype Semantics (1997). Oxford: OUP.
D. Geeraerts, S. Grondelaers & D. Speelman, Convergentie en divergentie in de Nederlandse woordenschat (2000). Amsterdam: Meertens.
D. Geeraerts, Words and Other Wonders. Papers on Lexical and Semantic Topics (2006). Berlin: Mouton de Gruyter.
D. Geeraerts, Theories of Lexical Semantics (2010). Oxford: OUP.
D. Geeraerts, Conceptual Structure and Conceptual Variation (2017). Shanghai: Foreign Language Education Press.
D. Geeraerts, Ten Lectures on Cognitive Sociolinguistics (2018). Leiden: Brill.

External links 
Career overview and academic bibliography 1978-2020
Overview of his main publications, with summaries
Valedictory lecture October 29, 2021
Website of the research unit QLVL

1955 births
Living people
Linguists from Belgium
Belgian cognitive scientists